Austorc d'Aorlhac or Aurilhac (fl. 1250) was an Auvergnat troubadour from whom only one sirvente survives. He was from Aurillac.

Austorc's only piece, "Ai! Dieus! Per qu'as facha tan gran maleza", was composed after the defeat in 1250 of the Seventh Crusade under Louis IX of France. It was Hermann Schindler who first proposed that the piece referred to the Crusade of 1250 and not that of 1270, on which Louis died. Whatever the Crusade, Kurt Lewent, whose dissertation was the first major study of Occitan Crusading songs, believed that Austorc was a combatant in it. Austorc was surprised that God would allow the Crusade's defeat, but not surprised that Christians would therefore convert to Islam. An excerpt goes like this:

Five stanzas in length, the sirventes stands incomplete: the first and last stanza contain lacunae and the final words of the tornada are lost. It is a contrafactum of a canso by Peirol, "M'entencio ai tot'en un vers mesa." Only a few years earlier another sirventes and Crusade song, "Ir'e dolors s'es dins mon cor asseza", by Ricaut Bonomel had been composed as a contrafactum of Peirol's canso.

There was an Austorc d'Ornac who served as a consul at Montpellier in 1252.

Notes

External links
Lyric allusions to the crusades and the Holy Land

Christian critics of Islam
Medieval writers about the Crusades
13th-century French troubadours
People from Aurillac